Matty Storton (born 10 March 1999) is an English rugby league footballer who plays as a  and  for Hull Kingston Rovers in the Betfred Super League.

He previously played for the Bradford Bulls in League 1 and the Betfred Championship.

Background
Storton was born in Bradford, West Yorkshire, England.

He is a product of the Bradford Bulls Academy system. He signed a professional contract with the Bulls prior to the 2018 season.

Bradford Bulls
In the 2017 Bradford Bulls season, Storton featured in Round 12 (Toulouse Olympique).

In the 2018 season, he featured in the pre-season friendly against Dewsbury Rams.

He played in Round 24 (West Wales Raiders) to League 1 Final (Workington Town). He scored against West Wales Raiders (1 try), Oldham R.L.F.C. (1 try) and Hemel Stags (2 tries).

In the 2019 season, Storton featured in the pre-season friendlies against York City Knights, Halifax R.L.F.C., Huddersfield Giants, Batley Bulldogs and Toronto Wolfpack.

He played in Round 4 (York City Knights) to Round 18 (Halifax R.L.F.C.) then in Round 21 (Swinton Lions) to Round 23 (Toronto Wolfpack). He also played in Round 26 (Sheffield Eagles) to Round 27 (Rochdale Hornets). Storton also featured in the 2019 Challenge Cup in Round 4 (Keighley Cougars) then in Round 6 (Leeds Rhinos) to Quarter Final (Halifax R.L.F.C.). He scored against Leigh Centurions (2 tries), Swinton Lions (1 try) and Rochdale Hornets (1 try).

Hull Kingston Rovers
Storton made 19 appearances for Hull KR in the 2021 Super League season including the club's 28-10 semi-final loss against the Catalans Dragons.

Statistics
Statistics do not include pre-season friendlies.

References

External links
Hull Kingston Rovers profile
Bulls profile

1999 births
Living people
Bradford Bulls players
English rugby league players
Hull Kingston Rovers players
Rugby league players from Bradford
Rugby league second-rows